Vesele may refer to:
 Veselé (Děčín District), a village in the Ústí nad Labem Region of the Czech Republic
 Veselé, Slovakia, a village in Trnava Region of Slovakia
 Vesele, Spartak rural council, a village in Donetsk Oblast of Ukraine
 Vesele, Zaporizhia Oblast, an urban-type settlement in Zaporizhia Oblast of Ukraine
 Vesele, Sudak Municipality, a village in Crimea